Nachlaot (also Naḥlaʾoth) is a cluster of 23 courtyard neighborhoods in central Jerusalem surrounding the Mahane Yehuda Market. It is known for its narrow, winding lanes, old-style housing, hidden courtyards and many small synagogues. 

Neighborhoods in Nachlaot (plural of nachala, lit. "homestead") include Batei Broide, Batei Goral, Batei Minsk, Batei Munkacs, Batei Rand, Bet Ya'acov, Even Yisrael (built in 1875 it is the oldest of the group), Knesset Yisrael, Mahane Yehuda, Mazkeret Moshe, Mishkenot Yisrael, Nahalat Ahim, Nahalat Zion, Neve Bezalel, Neve Shalom, Ohel Moshe, Shevet Ahim, Shevet Zedek, Sukkat Shalom, Zikhron Tuvya, Zikhron Ya'acov, and Zikhron Yosef.

Name
Nahala, plural nahlaot (with different ways of transliterating/spelling it), is a Hebrew word for either heritage or estate.

History

The neighborhoods that make up the Nachlaot district were established beginning in the late 1870s outside the walls of the Old City, which was becoming increasingly overcrowded and unsanitary. The first was Even Yisrael, built in 1875 as the sixth neighborhood outside of the walls of Jerusalem's Old City. Its name was derived from the biblical verse (Genesis 49:24): "But his bow abode firm, and the arms of his hands were made supple, by the hands of the Mighty One of Jacob, from thence, from the Shepherd, the Stone of Israel."  The numerical value of stone ("Even" in Hebrew) also corresponds to the 53 homes first built there. Established that same year to the west of Even Yisrael, Mishkenot Yisrael is the second neighborhood of the Nachlaot. The name comes from a biblical verse: "How goodly are thy tents, O Jacob/Thy dwellings, O Israel." Mazkeret Moshe was founded by Sir Moses Montefiore in 1882 as an Ashkenazi neighborhood. Ohel Moshe is a Sephardi neighborhood established alongside it.

Former Israeli president Yitzhak Navon grew up in Ohel Moshe, and the neighborhood served as the inspiration for his play Bustan Sephardi (Sephardi Orchard). The Banai family, a famous family of actors and singers, lived in Nachlaot. A Syrian Jewish community settled in Nachlaot in 1900 and built the Ades Synagogue, which was completed in 1901. Jerusalem's Mahane Yehuda outdoor market is located next to Nachlaot. Rabbi Aryeh Levin, known as the "prisoners' rabbi" for his visits to members of the Jewish underground imprisoned in the Russian Compound, lived in Mishkenot Yisrael. Nahalat Ahim, south of Rehov Bezalel, was founded in 1925 for the Yemenite community.

In the wake of gentrification projects in the area, housing prices have risen steeply.

Religious institutions

At one time Nachlaot had a higher concentration of synagogues than anywhere else in the world, around 300 within a radius of just a few blocks. Many of these were not much more than a tiny room with space for only about a dozen worshippers. Over the decades, many have closed, and now there are about 100 left, such as Kol Rina, an Orthodox synagogue which offers prayer services modeled after the tunes and spirit of the late Rabbi Carlebach, and the N'vei Shalom (Raz) Synagogue, offering an inspiring Friday night Kabbalat Shabbat service intended to not just fulfill one's responsibility to pray, but to stir the heart and spirit. Rabbi Aaron Leibowitz runs a weekly Friday night service outdoors, at Reshimu.

The neighborhood includes the  Ades Synagogue, Ades Congregation, the flagship of the Syrian Halebi community, as well as the synagogues located in the Knesset Aleph (Beis Rachel), Batei Broide, and Batei Rand neighborhoods, following the tradition of Old Jerusalem, including followers of the Vilna Gaon as well as Hasidic tradition.

Or Zaruaa Synagogue, founded in 1926 by Rabbi Amram Aburbeh for the Ma'araviim Jewish congregation, also served as a yeshiva for religious students. The building located on 3 Shmuel Refaeli street in Nahalat Ahim neighborhood was declared a historic preservation site in 1989, under cultural heritage protection. Rabbi Ben-Zion Meir Hai Uziel, the chief rabbi of Erez Israel, appointed Aburbeh as chief rabbi of the Nachlaot neighbourhood from 1924 to 1951. He was succeeded by Rabbi Rahamim Levy, who served as Rav of Nachlaot until 2013.

The Romaniote community of Jerusalem holds its religious services in the synagogue Beit Avraham Ve'ohel Sarah liKehilat Ioanina, which is also in Nachlaot.

Cultural landmarks
The Gerard Behar Center, formerly known as Beit Ha'Am, opened in 1961. It was the venue for the 1961 trial of Adolf Eichmann and was renovated in 1983 as an arts centre.

Barbur Gallery is a nonprofit space originally  opened in Nachlaot for contemporary art and artists, offering changing  exhibitions, musical performances, movie screenings, video-art and art lectures. In 2020, the gallery relocated to the nearby Mamilla neighborhood.

Notable residents
Amram Aburbeh - Nachlaot's Chief Rabbi between 1925–1951
Ehud Banai (born 1953) - singer and songwriter
Yossi Banai (1932–2006) - singer, actor, and dramatist
Uzi Baram (born 1937) - former member of the Knesset and government minister
Alex Clare - English singer and songwriter, moved to Jerusalem in 2015
Aryeh Levin (1885-1969) - Orthodox rabbi dubbed the "Father of Prisoners"
Michael Levin (1984–2006) - American-Israeli paratrooper
Rami Levy (born 1955) - founder and owner of Israeli's third-largest retail supermarket chain
Uzi Narkiss (1925–1997) - Israeli general
Yitzhak Navon (1921–2015) - President of Israel; politician, diplomat, and author
Yosef Qafih (1917–2000) - Yemenite-Israeli authority on Jewish religious law
Aaron Razel (born 1974) - singer, musician
Yonatan Razel (born 1973) - American-Israeli singer, musician
Yosef Rivlin (1838–1897) - rabbi and neighborhood founder

See also
 Expansion of Jerusalem in the 19th century

References

 
Neighbourhoods of Jerusalem
19th-century establishments in Ottoman Syria
Populated places established in the 1870s